Ngala may be:
Lingala language, a Bantu trade language
Bangala language, another Bantu trade language, close to Lingala
Ngala language (Chadic), a Kotoko language
Ngala language (Sepik), an Ndu language
Ngala language (Zande), described by Santandrea
the Ngala dialect of Khumi Chin
 Nga La language